Forastero (born July 30, 1994) is the ring name of a Mexican luchador enmascarado, or masked professional wrestler, currently signed to Lucha Libre AAA Worldwide. He is known for his work for Mexico City-based Consejo Mundial de Lucha Libre (CMLL) where he portrays a heel ("bad guy") character. He is a second-generation professional wrestler, part of the Reyes family that includes his uncles Cien Caras, Máscara Año 2000 and Universo 2000 as well as cousins El Cuatrero, Sansón, Máscara Año 2000 Jr., and Universo 2000 Jr. His birth name is not a matter of public record, which is a strong tradition for masked wrestlers in Mexico, where their private lives are concealed from wrestling fans. His ring name is Spanish for "Outsider".

Forastero regularly teams up with his cousins El Cuatrero and Sansón under the name Nueva Generación Dinamita ("New Generation Dynamites"), continuing the family tradition started by Los Hermanos Dinamita (Cien Caras, Máscara Año 2000 and Universo 2000). The Nueva Generación Dinamita currently hold both the Occidente Trios Championship and the Mexican National Trios Championship.

Personal life
Forastero was born on July 30, 1994, in Lagos de Moreno, Jalisco, Mexico. At the time of his birth his maternal uncles Carmelo (known under the ring name Cien Caras), Jesús (Máscara Año 2000) and Andrés Reyes González (Universo 2000), were established professional wrestling headliners in Mexico. As Forastero is an enmascarado or "masked wrestler" his birth name is not a matter of public record, a tradition in lucha libre where the personal lives of masked wrestlers are concealed from the public. While neither of his parents were wrestlers Forastero followed in the footsteps of his uncles and received training from all three of them prior to, and following his in-ring debut. Several of his cousins such as El Cuatrero, Sansón, Universo 2000 Jr. and Máscara Año 2000 Jr.

Professional wrestling career
Forastero made his in-ring debut on February 15, 2015, for Leyendas Inmortales de la Lucha Libre (LILL). In his debut Forastero teamed with his cousins El Cuatrero and Sansón to defeat El Hijo del Mr. Mexico, Mr. Jack Jr. and Tyson la Bestia.

Consejo Mundial de Lucha Libre (2015–2021)
Twelve days later Forastero made his debut for Consejo Mundial de Lucha Libre (CMLL) as he teamed up with Flash I and Flash II to defeat his cousins Cuatrero, Sansón, and Rafaga.  Initially, Forastero would often face off against his cousins. Forastero was teamed up with El Hijo del Calavera and Magnum for a tournament to determine the next Occidente Trios Champions. In the first round, they defeated Dragol, Ebola, and Exterminador, but lost to El Cuatrero, Sansón and Jocker. During the summer of 2015 Forastero competed in his first-ever Lucha de Apuestas, or "bet match", the most prestigious match type in lucha libre. Forastero put his mask on the line in a 12-man steel cage match where the last person in the cage would be forced to unmask. Forastero escaped the cage midway through the match, a match that was eventually lost by Espectrum who had to unmask afterward. In the fall of 2015 Forastero began teaming with his cousins on a regular basis, with the trio adopting the name La Sangre Dinamita ("Dynamite Blood") and later Nueva Generación Dinamita (NGD; "New Generation Dynamites"), both homages to the Reyes' brothers team known as Los Hermanos Dinamita. On November 1, 2015, NGD defeated Furia Roja, Mr. Trueno and Rey Trueno to win the Occidente Trios Championship.

Forastero made his Mexico City debut in October 2016, making his main venue debut teaming with his cousins as they defeated Blue Panther Jr., Esfinge and The Panther. In early 2017 Forastero participated in his first major tournament as he was one of 16 second-generation wrestlers in that year's La Copa Junior ("The Junior Cup"). During the tournament, he eliminated Stigma but was eliminated by Blue Panther Jr. near the end of the match. Two months later Forastero was teamed up with Shocker for the 2017 version of the Gran Alternativa tournament. For the Gran Alternativa CMLL pairs up a rookie with a veteran wrestler for a tag team tournament. The two defeated Stigma and Titán in the first round of the tournament, but lost to Esfinge and Atlantis in the second round.

On July 25, 2017 Nueva Generación Dinamita added the Mexican National Trios Championship to their collections as CMLL decided to have them win the belts from Los Hijos del Infierno ("The Sons of the Inferno"; Ephesto, Luciferno and Mephisto). The trio would go on to win CMLL's La Copa dinastía, defeating the trios of Blue Panther, Blue Panther Jr., The Panter and then Dragon Lee, Místico and Pierroth. In March 2018 Forastero and Sansón entered a tournament for the vacant CMLL World Tag Team Championship, but were eliminated in the first round by Dragon Lee and Místico. At the CMLL 85th Anniversary Show, the Dinamitas defeated Atlantis, Soberano Jr., and Místico as part of CMLL's most important show of the year.

2019 was the first year that the three members of Nueva Generación Dinamita participated in the annual Fantastica Mania tour of Japan, ending the tour with a successful championship defense against Ángel de Oro, Atlantis, and Titán on its last day. 2019 also marked the first year that Forastero participated in the Universal Championship, a tournament where all 16 participants held a championship recognized by CMLL. He lost to Dragón Lee in the opening round. For the 2019 Torneo Nacional de Parejas Increíbles ("National Incredible Teams Tournament), Sansón was paired up with Flyer as a rudo (The "bad guy") and a técnico (the "Good guy") team up for the event. The odd couple were eliminated by Carístico and Mephisto in the first round . As part of the 66th anniversary of Arena Puebla, NGD successfully defended the Mexican National Trios Championship against Los Ingobernables (El Terrible, La Bestia del Ring, and Rush), in what was their tenth overall title defense.

During the 2020 Fantastica Mania tour, NGD successfully defended the Mexican National Trios Championship against Los Hermanos Chavez and Titán. Forastero and Carístico were teamed up for the 2020 version of the Torneo Nacional de Parejas Increíbles. The team qualified for the finals by defeating Mephisto and Titán, El Felino and Niebla Roja, and Bandido and Último Guerrero in the preliminary block. Two weeks later, on February 28, 2020, Forastero and Carístico defeated Bárbaro Cavernario and Volador Jr. in the finals. On March 26, 2021, they defeated Los Guerreros Laguneros to win the CMLL World Trios Championship. On August 10, 2021, CMLL announced the departure of Nueva Generación Dinamita.

Independent circuit (2014–current)
While working for CMLL, Forastero, like all CMLL workers, is allowed to take independent circuit bookings on days he is not needed by the company, not arranged through CMLL. NGD successfully defended the Mexican National Trios Championship against Los Kamikazes del Aire (Alas de Acero, Aramís, and Iron Kid) at a subsequent Lucha Memes show. On June 16, 2019, Forastero, Cuatrero, and Sansón appeared at the International Wrestling Revolution Group's annual Festival de las Máscaras show. The trio defeated their cousin Máscara Año 2000 Jr., who was teaming with Capo del Sur and Capo del Norte, who both use ring characters inspired by the original Los Dinamitas.

Championships and accomplishments
Consejo Mundial de Lucha Libre
CMLL World Trios Championship (1 time) – with El Cuatrero and Sansón
Mexican National Trios Championship (1 time) – with El Cuatrero and Sansón
Occidente Trios Championship (1 time) – with El Cuatrero and Sansón
La Copa dinastía (2017) – with El Cuatrero and Sansón
Torneo Nacional de Parejas Increíbles (2020) – with Carístico
Lucha Libre AAA Worldwide
AAA World Trios Championship (1 time) – with  El Cuatrero and Sansón
Pro Wrestling Illustrated
Ranked No. 201 of the top 500 singles wrestlers in the PWI 500 in 2021

References

1994 births
Living people
Mexican male professional wrestlers
Masked wrestlers
Professional wrestlers from Jalisco
People from Lagos de Moreno, Jalisco
Unidentified wrestlers
AAA World Trios Champions
Mexican National Trios Champions
21st-century professional wrestlers
CMLL World Trios Champions